Marshfield may refer to various places. In some instances, the name is a corruption of march, meaning a border.

In the United Kingdom
Marshfield, Gloucestershire, England
Marshfield, Newport, Wales

In the United States
Marshfield, Indiana
Marshfield, Maine
Marshfield, Massachusetts, a town
Marshfield (CDP), Massachusetts, a census-designated place in the town
Marshfield, Missouri
Marshfield, New York
Marshfield, Oregon (now Coos Bay since 1944)
Marshfield (Trenton, South Carolina), listed on the National Register of Historic Places
Marshfield, Vermont, a town
Marshfield (village), Vermont, in the town
Marshfield, Wisconsin
Marshfield Station, New Hampshire, at the base of the Mount Washington Cog Railway